Hardy County Schools is the operating school district within Hardy County, West Virginia. It is governed by the Hardy County Board of Education.

Schools

High schools
East Hardy High School  
Moorefield High School

Middle schools
East Hardy Early Middle School  
Moorefield Middle School

Elementary schools
Moorefield Elementary School

Schools no longer in operation
Mathias School 
Wardensville School

External links
Hardy County Schools

School districts in West Virginia
Education in Hardy County, West Virginia